DeSabla (also known as De Sabla, deSabla and de Sabla; formerly, Hupps Mill and Hupp) is an unincorporated community in Butte County, California. It lies at an elevation of 2762 feet (842 m). It was named after one of the Pacific Gas and Electric founders and is the site of Lake de Sabla reservoir and a powerhouse named for him. The community's ZIP code is 95954, and is shared with the community of Magalia. The area code is 530.

Climate
DeSabla has a hot-summer Mediterranean climate (Csa) according to the Köppen climate classification system.

History
The Hupp post office opened in 1909, changed its name to De Sabla in 1911, and closed in 1942. Hupp was named in honor of John Hupp, sawmill owner; De Sabla was named in honor of Eugene de Sabla, who supervised construction of a power generation station here in 1903.

References

Unincorporated communities in California
Unincorporated communities in Butte County, California